NA-60 Jhelum-I is a constituency for the National Assembly of Pakistan.

Members of Parliament

1970–1977: NW-32 Jhelum-I

1977–1988: NA-44 Jhelum-I

1988–2002: NA-45 Jhelum-I

2002–2018: NA-62 Jhelum-I

2018-2022: NA-66 Jhelum-I

Election 2002 

General elections were held on 10 Oct 2002. Chaudhry Shahbaz Hussain of PML-Q won by 75,217 votes.

Election 2008 

The result of general election 2008 in this constituency is given below.

Result 
Raja Muhammad Safdar succeeded in the election 2008 and became the member of National Assembly.

Election 2013 

General elections were held on 11 May 2013. Chaudhry Khadim Hussain of PML-N won by 102,230 votes and became the  member of National Assembly.

Election 2018 
General elections were held on 25 July 2018.

See also
NA-59 Chakwal-cum-Talagang
NA-61 Jhelum-II

References

External links 
Election result's official website
Delimitation 2018 official website Election Commission of Pakistan

66
66